For detailed lists of tourist attractions in the countries of the United Kingdom see:

 List of tourist attractions in England
 List of tourist attractions in Northern Ireland
 List of tourist attractions in Scotland
 List of tourist attractions in Wales

See also 
 Tourism in the United Kingdom

References